Hüseyin Başaran (1958, Eskişehir Province, Turkey – December 27, 2015, Söğütözü, Turkey) was a Turkish sports commentator.

References

1958 births
2015 deaths
Sports commentators
Turkish mass media people